The Atlantis Plastics shooting was an incident of mass murder that took place at an Atlantis Plastics factory in Henderson, Kentucky, United States on June 25, 2008. The gunman, 25-year-old Wesley Neal Higdon, shot and killed five people and critically injured a sixth person before taking his own life. The shooting is the worst in the history of Henderson County, Kentucky in terms of casualties, surpassing triple homicides occurring in 1799 and 1955.

Details
Henderson police said that the shooter, who had a reputation for being difficult, had argued with supervisor Kevin Taylor and was being escorted out of the factory by the supervisor. The shooter apparently retrieved a handgun, shot the supervisor, then went back into the factory and shot five co-workers before turning the gun on himself. Subsequent reports indicate that Taylor had reprimanded Higdon twice before the shooting, once for talking on his cell phone too much and for not wearing safety glasses, then later for an altercation with co-worker Joshua Hinojosa at a convenience store across the street from the factory.

The victims were all shot with a Hi-Point Model JHP .45-caliber pistol. Taylor was apparently shot by Higdon outside the factory, then four more workers in the factory's break room, and finally Hinojosa from behind on the factory floor. Higdon then committed suicide.

Victims

Deceased
 Wesley Neal Higdon, gunman, 25, of Henderson
 Joshua Hinojosa, co-worker, 28, of Sebree
 Trisha Mirelez, co-worker, 25, of Sebree
 Israel Monroy, co-worker, 29, of Henderson
 Kevin G. Taylor, supervisor, 40, of Dixon
 Rachael Vasquez, co-worker, 26, of Sebree

Injured
 Noelia Monroy, co-worker, of Higdon

References

2008 in Kentucky
2008 mass shootings in the United States
2008 murders in the United States
Attacks in the United States in 2008
Crimes in Kentucky
Deaths by firearm in Kentucky
Henderson County, Kentucky
June 2008 crimes
Massacres in the United States
Mass murder in 2008
Mass shootings in Kentucky
Mass shootings in the United States
Murder–suicides in Kentucky
Workplace shootings in the United States
Henderson, Kentucky